The McCulloch House Museum in Pictou, Nova Scotia is a site of the Nova Scotia Museum. It boasts interpretive materials designed to tell the story of Thomas McCulloch and his roles in education and politics in Pictou in the early 19th century. As well, the McCulloch House museum is host to a large collection of artifacts, many being Dr. McCulloch's personal belongings from his educating days. The museum is affiliated with the adjacent Genealogy Centre, formerly known as the Hector Exhibit Centre and Archives. Both are administered by the Pictou County Genealogy and Heritage Society.

The house is listed on the Canadian Register of Historic Places, and is built of brick with sandstone accents. It was built by McCulloch circa 1806 as a -story cottage, situated on top of a knoll overlooking Pictou Harbour. In about 1890 a gambrel roof and dormer were added.

The museum was closed in the late 1990s for structural repairs. It reopened in 2006 with new interpretation and exhibits.

References

Further reading
 Scottish buildings of urban and rural Pictou, p17 Photograph of MacCulloch House prior to roof alteration.

External links
 McCulloch House Museum
 McCulloch House Museum & Genealogy Centre

Museums in Pictou County
Historic house museums in Nova Scotia
Nova Scotia Museum